John William Johnson (12 February 1919 – 1975) was an English professional footballer, who played for Huddersfield Town, Grimsby Town and Shrewsbury Town. He was born in Newcastle upon Tyne, Northumberland.

References

Date of death missing
Place of death missing
1919 births
1975 deaths
20th-century English people
Association football midfielders
English footballers
English Football League players
Grimsby Town F.C. players
Huddersfield Town A.F.C. players
Shrewsbury Town F.C. players
Footballers from Newcastle upon Tyne